Theodore Allen Slaman (born April 17, 1954) is a professor of mathematics at the University of California, Berkeley who works in recursion theory.

Slaman and W. Hugh Woodin formulated the Bi-interpretability Conjecture for the Turing degrees, which conjectures that the partial order of the Turing degrees is logically equivalent to second-order arithmetic.  They showed that the Bi-interpretability Conjecture is equivalent to there being no nontrivial automorphism of the Turing degrees.  They also exhibited limits on the possible automorphisms of the Turing degrees by showing that any automorphism will be arithmetically definable.

References

External links
home page.

Living people
American logicians
20th-century American mathematicians
21st-century American mathematicians
University of California, Berkeley faculty
Harvard University alumni
1954 births
Gödel Lecturers